Einat Admony (born 1971) is an Israeli chef, restaurant owner, cookbook author, and comedian.

Early life 
Admony is Israeli born on May 19, 1971, raised in the city of Bnei Brak. She is of Iraqi, Iranian, and Yemenite descent. She served in the IDF as a driver and cook.

Career 
Admony was one of the first chefs to introduce Israeli cuisine to Americans. She has opened 13 restaurants throughout her career. Her New York eateries include Taim Falafel, Kish-Kash, and Balaboosta. The Taim franchise, with six locations across the U.S., was made possible by an investment from Chipotle, the Mexican fast-food chain.

She appeared on the Food Network’s reality television show Chopped three times and won twice. Admony returned as a judge on the show. Host Ted Allen lists Admony as one of the four most memorable women to compete on the show.

In 2019, Admony took comedy lessons and began performing at the Comedy Cellar in New York. She is a contributor to Epicurious.

In 2022, Admony will compete in Season 3 of Guy Fieri's Tournament of Champions.

Awards and recognition 
She was selected by Time Out New York as one of “ten women who make NY a better place,” and as a “2020 Rising Female Chef.”

In 2014 she was named a Great Immigrant by the Carnegie Corporation of New York. Also in 2014, her Bar Bolonat restaurant in the West Village was named “Best New Restaurant” by the New York Times.

In 2020 she was a semifinalist for the James Beard Awards, in the Best Chef New York State category.

Bibliography
with Janna Gur. Shuk: From Market to Table, the Heart of Israeli Home Cooking. New York: Artisan (2019). 
Balaboosta. New York: Artisan (2013).

Personal 
She is married to Stefan Nafziger, who is also her business partner. They have two children. The family lives in Brooklyn.

References 

Israeli expatriates in the United States
Living people
Women cookbook writers
Women food writers
Israeli chefs
Israeli Mizrahi Jews
Cookbook writers
Jewish Israeli writers
Israeli people of Iraqi-Jewish descent
Israeli people of Iranian-Jewish descent
Women chefs
Writers from Brooklyn
1971 births